Carl Chester Van Dyke (February 18, 1881 – May 20, 1919) was an American soldier, lawyer and politician from Minnesota.

Van Dyke was born in Alexandria and attended the local public schools there. He taught primary school classes in surrounding Douglas County from 1899 to 1901. Later that year, he volunteered for the U.S. Army and served as a private in Company B, 15th Regiment, Minnesota Volunteer Infantry during the Spanish–American War. In 1916, he graduated from the St. Paul College of Law (later accredited as the William Mitchell College of Law) and was admitted to the bar at St. Paul. Van Dyke did not engage in extensive practice. He was elected Commander-in-Chief of the United Spanish War Veterans on September 6, 1918.

Van Dyke was elected as a Democrat to the Sixty-fourth, Sixty-fifth, and Sixty-sixth congresses and served from March 4, 1915, until his death in Washington, D.C., May 20, 1919.  On April 6, 1917, he voted against declaring war on Germany. His interment was in a mausoleum in Forest Cemetery, St. Paul, Minnesota.

See also
List of United States Congress members who died in office (1900–49)

References

External links
Carl Chester Van Dyke entry at The Political Graveyard

Carl C. Van Dyke, Late a Representative from Minnesota

1881 births
1919 deaths
American military personnel of the Spanish–American War
Burials in Minnesota
Minnesota lawyers
United States Army soldiers
William Mitchell College of Law alumni
Democratic Party members of the United States House of Representatives from Minnesota
20th-century American politicians
19th-century American politicians
People from Alexandria, Minnesota
19th-century American lawyers
20th-century American lawyers